The Symphony No. 8 Autumnal Fragments, Op. 81, is the eighth symphony by the Finnish composer Aulis Sallinen.  The work was commissioned by the Royal Concertgebouw Orchestra and was completed in October 2001.  Its world premiere was given by the Royal Concertgebouw Orchestra conducted by Paavo Järvi at the Concertgebouw on April 16, 2004.

Composition

Background
The symphony is cast in one continuous movement and has a duration of approximately 20 minutes.  Sallinen described its composition in the score program notes, remarking, "I have sought to combine two contrasting elements in this work: one that is fragmentary and sketchy, and one that maintains a symphonic discipline and coherence."  He continued:

The music quotes the "Theme of the Dead" from Sallinen's 1992 opera Kullervo.  Additionally, the "Bell Theme" of the symphony's finale is a homage to the Royal Concertgebouw Orchestra; this theme consists of the possible musical notes contained in the words "Concertgebouw Amsterdam," or CCEGEBAEDA.

The composition of the symphony was influenced by the September 11 attacks, which occurred late in the writing process.  Sallinen wrote, "The title Autumnal Fragments refers not only to the age of the composer, but also the tragic events of September 11. That is why the finale turned out to be different from my original design."

Instrumentation
The work is scored for a large orchestra consisting of four flutes (3rd and 4th doubling piccolo), three oboes, three clarinets (4th doubling bass clarinet), three bassoons (3rd doubling contrabassoon), four horns, three trumpets, three trombones, tuba, timpani, four percussionists, harp, and strings.

Reception
The symphony has been praised by music critics.  Reviewing a 2005 performance by the Cincinnati Symphony Orchestra at Carnegie Hall, Anthony Tommasini  of The New York Times described the piece as "like a string of boldly disconnected rhythmic riffs, melodic motives and aborted attempts at development."  Tommasini further remarked:
Guy Rickards of Gramophone said the title "seems at odds with the music's unbroken flow and much of the work's dynamic arises from this tension between static and moving elements, encapsulated right at the start, dominated by the percussion."  He added, "The process of integrating these irreconcilable elements has a kinship with that in Sallinen's Fifth, Washington Mosaics, but the Eighth's structure is more obviously integrated and quietly compelling."

References

Symphonies by Aulis Sallinen
2001 compositions
Sallinen 8
Music about the September 11 attacks
Music commissioned by the Royal Concertgebouw Orchestra